Sa'ad ad-Din II, reigned  – c. 1403 or c. 1414, was a Sultan of the Ifat Sultanate. He was the brother of Haqq ad-Din II, and the father of Mansur ad-Din, Sabr ad-Din II and Badlay ibn Sa'ad ad-Din. The historian Richard Pankhurst describes him as "the last great ruler of Ifat."

Reign
Sa'ad ad-Din II was born in Zeila. He was known for his fearless fight again the Abyssinian empire. Some historians now claim that he was born at the court of Emperor Newaya Krestos. He revolted against the Ethiopian Emperor. Pankhurst adds that Sa'ad ad-Din also fought against the kingdom of the Hadiya and a pastoral people called the Zalan, both of whom were Christian allies. However, as Taddesse Tamrat notes, these successes were short-lived, and in response to the growing Muslim power in the region Emperor Dawit I strengthened the Ethiopian defenses along the border and established his court at Tilq in Fatagar.

Despite these steps, Sa'ad ad-Din's practice of making quick raids into Ethiopian territory presented a difficult challenge to the Ethiopian Emperor, there were several fights between the Abyssinians and it was not until the Sultan was pursued deep into Ifat territory that the Ethiopians would face him on in a pitched battle. After a battle between Sa'ad ad-Din and the Ethiopian general Barwa, in which the Ifat army was defeated and "no less than 400 elders, each of whom carried an iron bar as his insignia of office" were killed, Sa'ad ad-Din with his remaining supporters were chased to furthest part of Zeila There, the Ethiopian army besieged Zeila, finally capturing the city and killing Sultan Sa'ad ad-Din on the island.

Death
With Sa'ad ad-Din's death, the Walashma dynasty adopted the title of "kings of Adal". His ten sons took refuge in Yemen at the court of King Ahmad bin al-Ashraf.

He was captured by the army of the Ethiopian commander Banwa who executed him.

Legacy
Sa'ad ad-Din's tomb stood as a hallowed site for centuries in Zeila. It was visited by Richard Burton the explorer in 1854, who described it as "a mound of rough stones surrounding an upright pole" near the cemetery, decorated with "the remains of votive banquets, broken stones, dried garbage, and stones blackened by the fire" showing how he was "properly venerated" as the current favorite saint of Zeila. Trimingham notes that at the time he wrote his book (circa 1950), the tomb had been destroyed by the encroaching sea.

Additionally, the Saad ad-Din Islands in Somalia, off the coast of Zeila, are named in Sa'ad ad-Din's honour.

See also
Walashma dynasty

Works cited

Notes

Sultans of Ifat
15th-century monarchs in Africa
15th-century Somalian people
Somalian Muslims
Year of birth missing
Year of death missing